The New York Film Critics Circle Award for Best Picture is an award given by the New York Film Critics Circle, honoring the finest achievements in filmmaking.

Winners

1930s

1940s

1950s

1960s

1970s

1980s

1990s

2000s

2010s

2020s

See also
Los Angeles Film Critics Association Award for Best Film
Chicago Film Critics Association Award for Best Film
Academy Award for Best Picture

References

New York Film Critics Circle Awards
Awards for best film
Lists of films by award